Jorge Afonso (c. 1470 – 1540) was an important Portuguese Renaissance painter.

Jorge Afonso was nominated royal painter in 1508 by King Manuel I and again in 1529 by John III. He was mainly based in Lisbon, with a workshop near the Igreja de São Domingos. A whole generation of Portuguese painters was educated in his workshop, including Cristóvão de Figueiredo, Garcia Fernandes, Gregório Lopes and Jorge Leal, among others.

The main painted altarpieces attributed to Jorge Afonso were commissioned by the old Queen Leonor, widow of King John II and sister of Manuel I. For the former Queen, Jorge Afonso painted the main altarpiece of the Convent of Madre de Deus, in Lisbon, in 1515. This magnificent altarpiece is now in the National Museum of Ancient Art, in Lisbon. Between 1520 and 1530, Jorge Afonso painted the 14 panels of the main altarpiece of the Monastery of Jesus, in Setúbal, again sponsored by Queen Leonor. The panels can be seen in the museum of the Monastery.

Jorge Afonso's workshop is also linked to the painted decoration of the walls of the Round Church of the Convent of Christ, in Tomar, executed in the 1530s.

Notes

Bibliography 

Portuguese Renaissance painting (by Maria José Palla , João Augusto Laurentino).

External links
Paintings by Jorge Afonso in Six Centuries of Portuguese Painting website.

1470s births
1540 deaths
15th-century Portuguese people
Portuguese Renaissance painters
16th-century Portuguese people
15th-century Portuguese painters
Portuguese male painters